Arthur Dexter (11 January 1905 – 1997) was an English footballer who played as a goalkeeper in the Football League for Nottingham Forest.

References

1905 births
1997 deaths
English footballers
Association football goalkeepers
English Football League players
Nottingham Forest F.C. players